Thomas William Sampson (born 18 August 1954 in Southwark, Greater London) is an English former professional footballer who played in the Football League, as a defender for one game for Millwall. He went on for a long non-league career with Dartford. After he finished playing he went on to manage Tonbridge Angels, Herne Bay, Deal Town, Ashford Town, Dartford FC. and Redhill. His most successful management moment was when he guided Deal Town to victory in the FA Vase in May 2000. However he suffered a stroke in December 2007, when he was manager of Redhill and stopped his management career in August 2008.

References

Sources

Author of Sudden Exit published December 2013

1954 births
Living people
Footballers from Southwark
English footballers
Association football defenders
Millwall F.C. players
Dartford F.C. players
English Football League players
English football managers
Tonbridge Angels F.C. managers
Herne Bay F.C. managers
Deal Town F.C. managers
Ashford United F.C. managers
Boreham Wood F.C. managers
Dartford F.C. managers
Redhill F.C. managers